Bill Mason (born 1940 in Hundred, West Virginia) is an American jewel thief who, in his 2004 autobiography Confessions of a Master Jewel Thief, avers that he has stolen $35,000,000 in property from the private residences and hotel rooms, with targets including Phyllis Diller, Johnny Weissmuller and Armand Hammer.

In popular culture 
In 2007, the second story on the episode "Religious Prey: Greater Ministries Int'l / It Takes a Thief", of the television series American Greed, covered his story, including extensive interviews with Mason.

In 2010, Confessions of a Master Jewel Thief was optioned by Anthony Mastromauro of Identity Films.

References

External links 
 CNN interview
 "King Of Cat Burglars" Newspaper article about Mason and his book

People from Hundred, West Virginia
Writers from Shaker Heights, Ohio
Jewel thieves
1940 births
Living people